0X or 0-X (zero X) may refer to:

 0x, a prefix for hexadecimal numeric constants in computing
 C++11, standard for the C++ programming language, previously called C++0x
 Zero X, electric motorcycle manufactured by Zero Motorcycles
 Zero-X, fictitious Earth spacecraft in Supermarionation productions
 , a living cellular automaton from the eponymous third novel in the Of Man and Manta series
 0x (decentralized exchange infrastructure), a blockchain protocol

See also
X0 (disambiguation)